"Follow Me" is a song by Dutch DJ Sam Feldt and British singer Rita Ora, released on 10 December 2021 via 	
Palm Tree Records and Good Soldier Songs. The song was written by Ella Henderson, Ollie Green, Dominic Lyttle, Mike Needle, Rita Ora and Sam Feldt, and produced by Feldt and Lyttle.

Music video
The music video was released on 17 December 2021 and directed by Johannes Lovund. It was shot in the California desert, and depicts the life of a young couple who work on a farm and are trying to save enough money to leave.

Credits and personnel
Credits adapted from Tidal.

 Dominic Lyttle – producer, composer
 Sam Feldt – producer, composer, lyricist, associated performer
 Ella Henderson – composer
 Mike Needle – composer
 Ollie Green – composer, drum programmer
 Rita Ora – composer, associated performer, vocal
 Jordan Schultz – mixing engineer
 Trevor Muzzy – recording engineer
 Cameron Gower Poole – vocal producer

Charts

Weekly charts

Year-end charts

Release history

References

2021 singles
2021 songs
Sam Feldt songs
Rita Ora songs
Songs written by Ella Henderson
Songs written by Rita Ora
Songs written by Ollie Green (record producer)
Songs written by Mike Needle